Rissoina bertholleti is a species of minute sea snail, a marine gastropod mollusk or micromollusk in the family Rissoinidae.

Description
The shell is elongated and thick. It has seven to eight convex whorls. There is a thick cord running over the abapical end of the body whorl. The color is a whitish with a blurry brown suprasutural band, fading out on the body whorl. The height of the shell is between 4 mm and 7 mm.

Distribution
This marine species occurs worldwide: in the Eastern Mediterranean Sea, the Red Sea and the Indian Ocean off Madagascar

References

 Dautzenberg, Ph. (1929). Contribution à l'étude de la faune de Madagascar: Mollusca marina testacea. Faune des colonies françaises, III (fasc. 4). Société d'Editions géographiques, maritimes et coloniales: Paris. 321-636, plates IV-VII pp
 Streftaris, N.; Zenetos, A.; Papathanassiou, E. (2005). Globalisation in marine ecosystems: the story of non-indigenous marine species across European seas. Oceanogr. Mar. Biol. Annu. Rev. 43: 419-453
 Gofas, S.; Le Renard, J.; Bouchet, P. (2001). Mollusca, in: Costello, M.J. et al. (Ed.) (2001). European register of marine species: a check-list of the marine species in Europe and a bibliography of guides to their identification. Collection Patrimoines Naturels, 50: pp. 180–213

External links
 

Rissoinidae
Gastropods described in 1869